Ivan Sydorovych Yizhakevych (January 18, 1864 – January 19, 1962) was a Soviet and Ukrainian painter and writer, People's Painter of the Ukrainian SSR (1951).

Life, education and work 
Yizhakevych was born in the village of Vyshnopil, Kiev Governorate. He was educated in the M. Murashko School of Art in Kyiv, Ukraine from 1882 to 1884. Following this Yizhakevych studied at the St. Petersburg Academy of Arts from 1884 to 1888.

Yizhakevych's paintings reflect themes from Ukrainian history, such as Kyi, Shchek and Khoryv, Cossack battles, and Haidamaky. Yizhakevych also illustrated works by Ukrainian writers, among them: Taras Shevchenko, Lesya Ukrainka, Ivan Kotliarevsky, Ivan Franko, and produced paintings of common people and their lives.

Yizhakevych made numerous artistic contributions to Kyiv churches.

References

1864 births
1962 deaths
19th-century male artists from the Russian Empire
19th-century Ukrainian male artists
19th-century Ukrainian painters
20th-century Ukrainian male artists
20th-century Ukrainian painters
Painters from the Russian Empire
People from Cherkasy Oblast
People from Kiev Governorate
Recipients of the title of People's Painter of Ukraine
Recipients of the Order of the Red Banner of Labour
Soviet painters
Soviet printmakers
Ukrainian male painters
Ukrainian printmakers
Burials at Baikove Cemetery